A Temporary Dive is the second studio album by the Norwegian singer-songwriter Ane Brun, initially released in Norway and Sweden on 7 February 2005. The album debuted at No. 1 in her native Norway.

The track "Song No. 6" features the Canadian singer-songwriter Ron Sexsmith and also appears on her Duets album. It was recorded at an after-show party following their performances at the Storsjöyran festival in Östersund, Sweden. The track "Balloon Ranger" was said by Ane to be analogous to her troubles learning the English language, or rather how she sometimes comes up with nonsense words that have no inherent meaning. She later used the song's title for the name of her record label.

Versions of the album were released in the UK and US in 2006, and in Japan in 2007, each with different track listings and different artwork. The original album was re-released on CD for the European market in spring 2010, featuring new artwork (the same as that used for the 2006 US release) and a bonus track, "Half Open Door".

Track listing

2010 European reissue bonus track

2006 UK version

2006 US version

2007 Japan version

Charts

References

Ane Brun albums
2005 albums